Czerniejewo  is a town and municipality in central Poland with 2,654 inhabitants as of December 2021.

It is situated in Gniezno County, in the Greater Poland Voivodeship (since 1999), previously in Poznań Voivodeship (1975–1998). Czerniejewo is located on the Wrześnica River, in a predominantly farming area. It is 15 km from Gniezno, and 12 km from Września.

History

Human settlement in Czerniejewo dates back to prehistoric times, however, the earliest mention of the settlement comes from 1284. At that time the town already had the right to hold markets. By 1390 the town had full Magdeburg rights. In 1581 King Stephen Báthory granted the town the right to hold trade fairs. Czerniejewo was a private town of Polish nobility, administratively located in the Gniezno County in the Kalisz Voivodeship in the Greater Poland Province of the Polish Crown. It often changed owners, among which were the Czarnkowski family (from 1594 to 1644) and the Opaliński family (from 1644 to 1726). In 1771 General Jan Lipski began building a palace, adjacent to the town, which was completed in 1780.

In the Second Partition of Poland, in 1793, Czerniejewo was annexed by Prussia, and was called Schwarzenau. From 1807 to 1815 it was part of the short-lived Polish Duchy of Warsaw and in 1815 returned to Prussia as part of the Grand Duchy of Poznań. In 1871 it became part of Germany. The town was connected to the German railway system in 1875. In 1918, following World War I, Poland regained independence, and in 1918-1919 the inhabitants participated in the large Greater Poland Uprising (1918–1919), and the town was reintegrated with the reborn Polish state under its historic name Czerniejewo.

During the invasion of Poland, which started World War II in September 1939, the town was invaded and then occupied by Germany. The first expulsions of local Polish inhabitants were carried out by the occupiers in November and December 1939. In January 1945, the Red Army captured the town, and afterwards it was restored to Poland.

Notable residents
Onufry Kopczyński (1736–1817), educator and grammarian of the Polish language during the Polish Enlightenment

Gallery

References

This article is based in part on material from the Polish Wikipedia.

External links

 Czerniejewo official town webpage in Polish;
 map of Czerniejewo area from Szukacz;
 Early Medieval Hoard from Kąpiel, Czerniejewo commune, Wielkopolska voivodeship Archaeology Museum of Poznan;
 History of Czerniejewo in Polish;
 Czerniejewo official municipal (gmina) webpage in Polish ;

Cities and towns in Greater Poland Voivodeship
Gniezno County
Poznań Voivodeship (1921–1939)